Louis Jaque (May 1, 1919, in Montreal – January 7, 2010, in Montreal) was a Canadian painter who belonged to the Quebec modernist movement of the post war period.

Biography
Jaque received his diploma from the Ecole du Meuble where he studied under Jean-Paul Lemieux and Paul-Emile Borduas. He embraces abstraction in the 1950s. Solo exhibition at the Montreal Museum of Contemporary Art in 1966. He was one of the founding members in 1969 of the Société des Artistes Professionnels du Québec (SAPQ) and its first president. He made a monumental mural for the Quebec pavilion at the Osaka Universal Exhibition in Japan in 1970 and another one in 1972 for the Maison de Radio-Canada (CBC) on René-Lévesque Boulevard in Montreal. In 1977 the Montreal Museum of Fine Arts organized a large retrospective exhibition of his work under the title: Louis Jaque, 25 ans de carrière. He was a member of the Royal Canadian Academy of Arts. His works can be found in many private and public collections, mainly in Canada, France, Italy and the United States.

Collections
National Gallery of Canada, Ottawa
Musée National des Beaux-Arts du Québec
Montreal Museum of Fine Arts
Art Gallery of Nova Scotia
Beaverbrook Art Gallery, Fredericton, New Brunswick
Montreal Museum of Contemporary Art
Musée des Beaux-Arts de Sherbrooke
Musée d'art de Joliette
Musée Laurier

References

Canadian painters
1919 births
2010 deaths